Deadlands is the third studio album by Norwegian metal band Madder Mortem, released on Century Media Europe on 21 October 2002.  Released in the US on The End Records, 11 February 2003.
It was the final CD to be released by them on Century Media Records. The band have since signed to Peaceville records.

Track listing 

The album was re-released in the UK on Peaceville Records, November 2009, with two bonus tracks:

 "The Exile" – 5:34
 "Deadlands Revisited" – 5:48

Personnel 
Madder Mortem
Agnete M. Kirkevaag – lead vocals
BP M. Kirkevaag – guitars, percussion, backing vocals
Eirik Ulvo Langnes – guitars
Paul Mozart Bjorke – bass, percussion, backing vocals
Mads Solås – drums, percussion

Production
Produced by Madder Mortem and Pelle Saether
Engineered by Pelle Saether, Lars Lindén and Madder Mortem
Mixed by Pelle Saether
Mastering by Ulf Horbelt at DMS, Marl, Germany
Bonus track production
Recorded at Loppa & Huseby
Ingvild "Sareeta" Kaare – violin, strings
Produced, engineered, mixed by BP M. Kirkevaag
Mastering by Peter In de Betou at Tailor Maid

References 

2002 albums
Madder Mortem albums
Century Media Records albums
The End Records albums
Peaceville Records albums